Mugalkhod  is a village in the northern state of Karnataka, India. It is located in the Raybag taluk of Belgaum district in Karnataka.

Demographics
At the 2001 India census, Mugalkhod had a population of 7168 with 3677 males and 3491 females.
It's  10 km from Mahalingpur and 10 km from Mudhol

See also
 Belgaum
 Districts of Karnataka

References

External links
 http://Bagalkot.nic.in/

 Villages in Bagalkot district